Christella cyatheoides is a species of fern found on islands of the central Pacific Ocean.

References

Thelypteridaceae
Flora of Hawaii